Protection sports are dog sports that test a dog's ability to protect itself and its handler. All protection sports test the complete temperament of the dog, not just its protectiveness. The dog must be safe for its handler and for the public. The dog must be able to control itself upon command. All protection sports are modeled to some extent on the way dogs are used in police work. The first trial of "Ring Sport" was organized in 1903 in Mechelen (French: Malines), Belgium.

Sport names

 Belgian Ring Sport
 French Ring Sport —  jumps, complex obedience, and several variants of attacks on a decoy (helper wearing bite-protection gear)
 KNPV (Koninklijke Nederlands Politiehond Vereniging) — Dutch, obedience and bite-work, no tracking
 Mondio Ring — obedience, agility (jumps) and protection
 Schutzhund/IPO/IGP — Traditional sport; competitions are regulated by Fédération Cynologique Internationale under the IGP name.

References